Kingstone is a ward in the metropolitan borough of Barnsley, South Yorkshire, England.  The ward contains eight listed buildings that are recorded in the National Heritage List for England.   Of these, one is listed at Grade II*, the middle of the three grades, and the others are at Grade II, the lowest grade.  The ward is to the southwest of the centre of Barnsley, and is residential.  It contains Locke Park, with three listed buildings, a statue, a tower and a bandstand.  The other listed buildings are a church, a former stable block, a former public swimming baths, a guest house, and the churchyard walls and railings of a demolished church.


Key

Buildings

See also 

 Listed buildings in Barnsley

References

Citations

Sources

 

Lists of listed buildings in South Yorkshire
Listed